Goma is a commune of the city of Goma in North Kivu, Democratic Republic of the Congo.  This is the southern part of the city going from the main road (also called La nationale N2) to the Kivu Lake.

It encompasses the following neighbourhoods:

 Les volcans
 Lac Vert
 Katindo
 Mapendo
 Mikeno
 Himbi
 Keshero

References

Goma
Communes of the Democratic Republic of the Congo